Florina Carmen Herea (born March 17, 1979 in Ploieşti) is a Romanian freestyle swimmer who represented her native country at two consecutive Summer Olympics, starting in 1996 in Atlanta, Georgia. Prior to the Sydney Games, she was a member of the women's relay team that won the gold medal in the 4×200 m freestyle at the European LC Championships 2000 in Helsinki, Finland.

External links
 Profile on Romanian Olympic Committee

1979 births
Living people
Romanian female freestyle swimmers
Olympic swimmers of Romania
Sportspeople from Ploiești
Swimmers at the 1996 Summer Olympics
Swimmers at the 2000 Summer Olympics